Douglas Henderson (January 14, 1919, in Montclair, New Jersey – April 5, 1978 in Studio City, California) was an American film and television actor.

Biography

Henderson served in the United States Marine Corps during World War II.

After having been active in stock theater in the eastern United States, Henderson shifted to film in 1952, with his appearance in Stanley Kramer's Eight Iron Men. Additional film appearances include the 1962 John Frankenheimer film The Manchurian Candidate, in which he played Col. Milt, the direct supervisor of the Maj. Marco character (played by Frank Sinatra). He played Congressman Morrissey in the 1968 comedy Stay Away, Joe starring Elvis Presley.

On television, Henderson made six guest appearances on Perry Mason, including the role of title character and defendant Felix Heidemann in the 1960 episode, "The Case of the Clumsy Clown". In 1963, he again played the defendant, this time Dwight Garrett, in "The Case of the Elusive Element". In 1965, he played murder victim Frank Jones, alias Frank Jensen, in "The Case of the Wrongful Writ", and in 1966, he again played the defendant, Greg Stanley, in "The Case of the Crafty Kidnapper".

Henderson committed suicide via carbon monoxide poisoning on April 5, 1978.

Filmography

Film
His credited film appearances included roles in:

She's a Sweetheart (1944) - Soldier
Objective, Burma! (1945) - Paratrooper (uncredited)
A Guy, a Gal and a Pal (1945) - Soldier (uncredited)
Over 21 (1945) - Officer Candidate (uncredited)
Flying Leathernecks (1951) - Lt. Foster (uncredited)
Fearless Fagan (1952) - Mail Clerk (uncredited)
Big Jim McLain (1952) - J.J. Donahue - Marine Boarding Ship (uncredited)
Back at the Front (1952) - Bit Role (uncredited)
Eight Iron Men (1952) - Hunter
The War of the Worlds (1953) - Staff Sergeant (uncredited)
Abbott and Costello Go to Mars (1953) - Announcer (uncredited)
From Here to Eternity (1953) - Cpl. Champ Wilson (uncredited)
Mad at the World (1955) - Ollie, Fingerprint Man (uncredited)
King Dinosaur (1955) - Dr. Richard Gordon
The Shrike (1955) - Burt Fielding (uncredited)
The Book of Acts Series (1957) - Hired Assassin
Invasion of the Saucer Men (1957) - Lt. Wilkins, USAF
God Is My Partner (1957) - George (Doctor) (uncredited)
The Dalton Girls (1957) - Bank Cashier
No Place to Land (1958) - Roy Dillon
Cage of Evil (1960) - Barney
Sniper's Ridge (1961) - Sgt. Sweatish
The Manchurian Candidate (1962) - Colonel Milt
Black Zoo (1963) - Lt. Mel Duggan
Johnny Cool (1963) - FBI Man
The Americanization of Emily (1964) - Capt. Marvin Ellender
The Sandpiper (1965) - Phil Sutcliff 
Fireball 500 (1966) - Agent Hastings
Don't Make Waves (1967) - Henderson
Stay Away, Joe (1968) - Congressman Morrissey
Pendulum (1969) - Detective Hanauer
Zig Zag (1970) - Dr. Leonard

TV Series
The main part of his career was in television. Television series in which he made appearances include:
The Adventures of Superman "Semi Private Eye" (1954) - Noodles
The Silent Service "The Jack at Tokyo" (1957) - Chief Machinist Mate Archer
Highway Patrol (1957-1958) - Jim Rogers / Buck Lester / George Wilson
Perry Mason (1959-1966) - Greg Stanley / Frank Jones / Dwight Garrett / Peter Gregson / Felix Heidemann / Ralph Curtis
The Outer Limits: The Architects of Fear, The Chameleon, and Behold, Eck!. (1963-1964) - Detective Lt. Runyan / Dr. Tillyard / Scientist
Hazel (1964) - Courtney Hicks
Combat! "Dateline" (1965) - G2 Intelligence officer, Captain Reardon
Bonanza (1965-1967) - Major Dawson / Dr. Evans / Reverend Holmes
The Virginian (1965-1969) - Ben Cooper / Sam Jenkins / Leonard Walters
The Wild Wild West (1966-1969) - Colonel James Richmond
Mannix (1965-1971) - Philip Crane / Thomas Ferguson / Simms / Townsman at Well (uncredited) / Tom Lockwood / Police Detective (uncredited)
The F.B.I. (1965-1971) - Thurman / SAC Converse / S.A.C. Page Blanchard / Bryant Durant / S.A.C. Bryant Durant
Mission Impossible (1971-1972) - Anders / George Miller / Henry Packard

References

External links
 
Biography at allmovie.com

1919 births
1978 deaths
American male film actors
American male television actors
20th-century American male actors
United States Marine Corps personnel of World War II